The Gottfried Wilhelm Leibniz Prize, in short Leibniz Prize, is awarded by the German Research Foundation to "exceptional scientists and academics for their outstanding achievements in the field of research". Since 1986, up to ten prizes are awarded annually to individuals or research groups working at a research institution in Germany or at a German research institution abroad. It is considered the most important research award in Germany.

The prize is named after the German polymath and philosopher Gottfried Wilhelm Leibniz (1646–1716). It is one of the highest endowed research prizes in Germany with a maximum of €2.5 million per award. Past prize winners include
Stefan Hell (2008), Gerd Faltings (1996), Peter Gruss (1994), Svante Pääbo (1992), Theodor W. Hänsch (1989), Erwin Neher (1987), Bert Sakmann (1987), Jürgen Habermas (1986), Hartmut Michel (1986), and Christiane Nüsslein-Volhard (1986).

Prizewinners

2020–2029 
2021 |
2020
2021:
 Asifa Akhtar, Epigenetics, Max-Planck-Institut für Immunbiologie und Epigenetik, Freiburg
 Elisabeth André, Computer Science, Universität Augsburg
 Giuseppe Caire, Theoretical Communications Engineering, Technical University of Berlin
 Nico Eisenhauer, Biodiversity Research, Universität Leipzig
 Veronika Eyring, Earth System Modelling, Deutsches Zentrum für Luft- und Raumfahrt, Standort Oberpfaffenhofen und Universität Bremen
 Katerina Harvati, Palaeoanthropology, Universität Tübingen und Senckenberg Centre for Human Evolution and Palaeoenvironment, Tübingen
 Steffen Mau, Sociology, Humboldt University of Berlin
 Rolf Müller, Pharmaceutical Biology, Helmholtz-Institut für Pharmazeutische Forschung Saarland (HIPS) und Universität des Saarlandes, Saarbrücken
 Jürgen Ruland, Immunology, Klinikum rechts der Isar, Technische Universität München
 Volker Springel, Astrophysics, Max-Planck-Institut für Astrophysik, Garching
2020:
 Thorsten Bach, Chemistry, Technical University of Munich
 Baptiste Jean Germain Gault, Materials Science, Max Planck Institute for Iron Research
 Johannes Grave, Art History, Friedrich-Schiller University of Jena
 Thomas Kaufmann, Evangelical Theology, Georg August University of Göttingen
 Andrea Musacchio, Cell Biology, Max Planck Institute for Molecular Physiology
 Thomas Neumann, Computer Science, Technical University of Munich
 Marco Prinz, Neuropathology, Albert Ludwig University of Freiburg
 Markus Reichstein, Biogeochemistry, Max Planck Institute for Biogeochemistry
 Dagmar Schäfer, History of Science, Max Planck Institute for the History of Science
 Juliane Vogel, Literature, University of Konstanz

2019–2010 
2019 |
2018 |
2017 |
2016 |
2015 |
2014 |
2013 |
2012 |
2011 |
2010
2019:
 Sami Haddadin, Robotics, Technical University of Munich
 Rupert Huber, Experimental physics, University of Regensburg
 Andreas Reckwitz, Sociology, Viadrina European University, Frankfurt (Oder)
 Hans-Reimer Rodewald, Immunology, German Cancer Research Center (DKFZ), Heidelberg
 Melina Schuh, cell biology, Max Planck Institute for Biophysical Chemistry (Karl-Friedrich-Bonhoeffer-Institute), Göttingen
 Brenda Schulman, Biochemistry, Max Planck Institute of Biochemistry (MPIB), Martinsried
 Ayelet Shachar, Law and Political science, Max Planck Institute for the Study of Religious and Ethnic Diversity, Göttingen
 Michèle Tertilt, Economics, University of Mannheim
 Wolfgang Wernsdorfer, experimental Solid-state physics, Karlsruhe Institute of Technology (KIT)
 Matthias Wessling, Chemical reaction engineering, RWTH Aachen University and Leibniz-Institut für Interaktive Materialien (DWI), Aachen
2018:
 Jens Beckert, Sociology, Max Planck Institute for the Study of Societies, Cologne
 Alessandra Buonanno, Gravitational Physics, Max Planck Institute for Gravitational Physics (Albert Einstein Institute), Potsdam
 Nicola Fuchs-Schündeln, Wirtschaftswissenschaften, Johann Wolfgang Goethe-Universität Frankfurt/Main
 Veit Hornung, Immunologie, Genzentrum, Ludwig Maximilian University of Munich and Eicke Latz, Immunologie, Universitätsklinikum Bonn, Rheinische Friedrich-Wilhelms-Universität Bonn
 Heike Paul, Amerikanistik, Friedrich-Alexander-Universität Erlangen-Nürnberg
 Erika L. Pearce, Immunologie, Max-Planck-Institut für Immunbiologie und Epigenetik, Freiburg/Breisgau
 , Experimentelle Festkörperphysik, Georg-August-Universität Göttingen
 Oliver G. Schmidt, Materialwissenschaften, Leibniz-Institut für Festkörper- und Werkstoffforschung Dresden und Fakultät für Elektrotechnik und Informationstechnik, Technische Universität Chemnitz
 Bernhard Schölkopf, Maschinelles Lernen, Max-Planck-Institut für Intelligente Systeme, Tübingen
 László Székelyhidi, Angewandte Mathematik, Universität Leipzig

2017:
 Lutz Ackermann, Organic Molecular Chemistry, University of Göttingen
 Beatrice Gründler, Arabistics, Free University Berlin
 Ralph Hertwig, Cognition Psychology, Max-Planck-Institute for Education research
 Karl-Peter Hopfner, Structure Biology, Ludwig Maximilian University of Munich
 Frank Jülicher, Theoretical Biophysics, Max-Planck-Institute for Physics of complex systems
 Lutz Mädler, Mechanical Process engineering, University of Bremen
 Britta Nestler, Material science, Karlsruhe Institute for Technology
 Joachim P. Spatz, Biophysics, Max-Planck-Institute for Intelligent Systems and Ruprecht-Karls-University Heidelberg
 Anne Storch, Africanistics, University of Köln
 Jörg Vogel, Medical Microbiology, University of Würzburg

2016:
 Frank Bradke, Neuroregeneration, German Center for Neurodegenerative Diseases (DZNE), Bonn
 Emmanuelle Charpentier, Infection Biology, Max Planck Institute for Infection Biology, Berlin
 Daniel Cremers, Computer Vision, Chair of Informatics IX: Image Understanding and Knowledge-Based Systems, Technical University of Munich
 Daniel James Frost, Mineralogy/Experimental Petrology, University of Bayreuth
 Dag Nikolaus Hasse, Philosophy, Institute of Philosophy, University of Würzburg
 Benjamin List, Organic Molecular Chemistry, Department of Homogeneous Catalysis, Max Planck Institute for Coal Research, Mülheim an der Ruhr
 Christoph Möllers, Law, Chair of Public Law and Legal Philosophy, Humboldt University of Berlin
 Marina Rodnina, Biochemistry, Max Planck Institute for Biophysical Chemistry (Karl Friedrich Bonhoeffer Institute), Göttingen
 Bénédicte Savoy, History of Modern Art, Center for Metropolitan Studies, Technical University of Berlin
 Peter Scholze, Arithmetic Algebraic Geometry, Mathematical Institute, University of Bonn

2015:
 Henry N Chapman, Biological Physics/X-Ray Physics, Deutsches Elektronen-Synchrotron (DESY), Hamburg, and University of Hamburg
 Hendrik Dietz, Biochemistry/Biophysics, Technical University of Munich
 Stefan Grimme, Theoretical Chemistry, University of Bonn
 Christian Hertweck, Biological Chemistry, Leibniz Institute for Natural Product Research and Infection Biology – Hans Knöll Institute (HKI), Jena, and University of Jena
 Friedrich Lenger, Modern and Contemporary History, University of Giessen
 Hartmut Leppin, Ancient History, Goethe University Frankfurt am Main
 Steffen Martus, Modern German Literature, Humboldt University of Berlin
 , Auditory Sensing/Otolaryngology, University of Göttingen

2014:
 Artemis Alexiadou, Linguistics, University of Stuttgart
 Armin von Bogdandy, Foreign public law and international law, Max Planck Institute for Comparative Public Law and International Law, Heidelberg
 Andreas Dreizler, Combustion research, Technische Universität Darmstadt
 Christof Schulz, Combustion and gas dynamics, Universität Duisburg-Essen
 Nicole Dubilier, Marine ecology, Max Planck Institute for Marine Microbiology, Bremen, and Universität Bremen
 Leif Kobbelt, Informatics and computer graphics, RWTH Aachen
 Laurens Molenkamp, Experimental solid-state physics, Universität Würzburg
 Brigitte Röder, Biological psychology/neuro-psychology, Universität Hamburg
 Irmgard Sinning, Structural biology, Universität Heidelberg
 Rainer Waser, Nanoelectronics/Materials science, RWTH Aachen and Peter Grünberg Institute, Research Center Jülich
 Lars Zender, Hepatology/oncology, Universitätsklinikum Tübingen

2013:
 Thomas Bauer, Islamic studies, Universität Münster
 Ivan Đikić, Biochemistry/cell biology, Universität Frankfurt am Main
 Frank Glorius, Molecular chemistry, Universität Münster
 Onur Güntürkün, Biological psychology, Universität Bochum
 Peter Hegemann, Biophysics, Humboldt-Universität zu Berlin
 Marion Merklein, Metal forming technology/manufacturing engineering, Universität Erlangen-Nürnberg
 Roderich Moessner, Max Planck Institute for the Physics of Complex Systems, Dresden, together with Achim Rosch, Theoretical solid-state physics, Universität zu Köln
 Erika von Mutius, Paediatrics, Allergology, Epidemiology, Klinikum der Universität München
 Vasilis Ntziachristos, Bio-imaging with optical techniques, Technische Universität München
 Lutz Raphael, Modern and recent history, Universität Trier

2012:
 Michael Brecht – Neurophysiology/cellular neuroscience (Bernstein Zentrum für Computational Neuroscience Berlin und Humboldt-Universität zu Berlin)
 Rainer Forst – political philosophy/theory (Johann Wolfgang Goethe-Universität Frankfurt am Main)
 Gunther Hartmann – Clinical pharmacology/natural immunity (Universitätsklinikum Bonn)Christian Kurts – Immunology/Nephrology (Universitätsklinikum Bonn)
 Matthias Mann – Biochemistry (Max Planck Institute of Biochemistry, Martinsried)
 Friederike Pannewick – Islamic studies/literature, theater, history of ideas (Philipps-Universität Marburg)
 Nikolaus Rajewsky – System biology (Max Delbrück Center for Molecular Medicine, Berlin)
 Ulf Riebesell – Oceanography (Leibniz-Institut für Meereswissenschaften (IFM-Geomar) an der University of Kiel)
 Peter Sanders – Theoretical computer science and algorithms (Karlsruher Institut für Technologie, KIT)
 Barbara Wohlmuth – Numerical analysis (Technische Universität München)
 Jörg Wrachtrup – Experimental physics (Universität Stuttgart)

2011:
 Michael Brecht, Neuroscience (Bernstein Center for Computational Neuroscience Berlin)
 Ulla Bonas, Microbiology / Molecular phytopathology (Universität Halle-Wittenberg)
 , Cognitive neuroscience (Universitätsklinikum Hamburg-Eppendorf)
 Anja Feldmann, Computer science / Computer networks / Internet (Technische Universität Berlin, T-Labs)
 Kai-Uwe Hinrichs, Organic geochemistry (Universität Bremen)
 Anthony A. Hyman, Cell biology / Microtubuli and cleavage (Max Planck Institute of Molecular Cell Biology and Genetics, Dresden)
 Bernhard Keimer, Experimental solid-state physics (Max Planck Institute for Solid State Research, Stuttgart)
 Franz Pfeiffer, X-ray physics (Technische Universität München)
 Joachim Friedrich Quack, Egyptology (Universität Heidelberg)
 Gabriele Sadowski, Thermodynamics (Technische Universität Dortmund)
 Christine Silberhorn, Quantum optics (Universität Paderborn)

2010:
 Jan Born, Neuroendocrinology / Sleep research (University of Lübeck)
 Peter Fratzl, Biomaterials (Max Planck Institute of Colloids and Interfaces, Potsdam)
 Roman Inderst, Macroeconomics (University Frankfurt/Main)
 Christoph Klein, Pediatrics / Oncology (Hannover Medical School)
 Ulman Lindenberger, Lifespan psychology (Max Planck Institute for Human Development, Berlin)
 Frank Neese, Theoretical chemistry (University of Bonn)
 Jürgen Osterhammel, Recent and modern history (University of Konstanz)
 Petra Schwille, Biophysics (Dresden University of Technology)
 Stefan Treue, Cognitive Neurosciences (German Primate Center, Göttingen)
 Joachim Weickert, Digital image processing (Saarland University)

2009–2000 
2009 |
2008 |
2007 |
2006 |
2005 |
2004 |
2003 |
2002 |
2001 |
2000

2009:
 Antje Boetius, Max Planck Institute for Marine Microbiology, Bremen
 Holger Braunschweig, Inorganic chemistry, University of Würzburg
 Wolfram Burgard, Computer science, University of Freiburg
 Heinrich Detering, University of Göttingen
 Jürgen Eckert, IFW Dresden, and Dresden University of Technology
 Armin Falk, Economist, University of Bonn
 Frank Kirchhoff, University of Ulm
 Jürgen Rödel, Materials scientist, Technische Universität Darmstadt
 Karl Lenhard Rudolph, University of Ulm
 Burkhard Wilking, University of Münster
 Martin R. Zirnbauer, University of Cologne

2008:
 Susanne Albers – theoretical computer science, University of Freiburg
 Martin Beneke – theoretical particle physics, RWTH Aachen
 Holger Boche – telecommunications engineering and information theory, Technische Universität Berlin
 Martin Carrier philosophy, Bielefeld University
 Elena Conti – structural biology, Max Planck Institute of Biochemistry, Martinsried
 Elisa Izaurralde – cell biology, Max Planck Institute for Developmental Biology, Tübingen
 Holger Fleischer – economic law, University of Bonn
 Stefan W. Hell – biophysics, Max Planck Institute for Biophysical Chemistry, Göttingen
 Klaus Kern – physical solid state chemistry, Max Planck Institute for Solid State Research, Stuttgart
 Wolfgang Lück – algebraic topology, University of Münster;
 Jochen Mannhart – experimental solid state physics, University of Augsburg

2007:
  – molecular diabetes research, endocrinology (University of Cologne)
 Patrick Bruno – theoretical solid-state physics (MPI of Microstructure Physics, Halle/Saale)
 Magdalena Götz – neurology (GSF – Forschungszentrum für Umwelt und Gesundheit and Ludwig Maximilian University of Munich)
 Peter Gumbsch – material science (Universität Karlsruhe (TH) and Fraunhofer-Institut für Werkstoffmechanik, Freiburg i. Br. and Halle/Saale)
 Gerald Haug – paleoclimatology (GeoForschungsZentrum Potsdam and University of Potsdam)
 Bernhard Jussen – mediaeval history (Bielefeld University)
 Guinevere Kauffmann – astrophysics (MPI for Astrophysics, Garching)
 Falko Langenhorst – mineralogy and petrology (Friedrich Schiller University of Jena)
 Oliver Primavesi – classical philology (Ludwig Maximilian University of Munich)
 Detlef Weigel – plant biology (MPI for Developmental Biology, Tübingen)

2006:
 Matthias Beller and Peter Wasserscheid – homogeneous catalysis (Leibniz-Institute for Organic Catalysis at the University of Rostock) and chemical processing (Friedrich-Alexander-Universität Erlangen-Nürnberg)
 Patrick Cramer – structural biology (Ludwig Maximilian University of Munich)
 Peter Jonas – neurophysiology (Albert Ludwigs University of Freiburg)
 Ferenc Krausz – quantum optics (Ludwig Maximilian University of Munich and Max Planck Institute for Quantum Optics, Garching)
 Klaus Mezger – geochemistry (University of Münster)
 Thomas Mussweiler – social psychology (University of Cologne)
 Felix Otto – analysis of partial differential equations (University of Bonn)
 Dominik Perler – history of philosophy/theoretical philosophy (Humboldt University of Berlin)
 Gyburg Radke – classical philology and philosophy (Philipps University of Marburg)
 Marino Zerial – cell biology (Max Planck Institute for Molecular Cell Biology and Genetics, Dresden)

2005:
 Peter Becker – cell biology/biochemistry (Ludwig Maximilian University of Munich)
 Immanuel Bloch – quantum optics (Johannes Gutenberg University of Mainz)
 Stefanie Dimmeler – molecular cardiology (Johann Wolfgang Goethe University Frankfurt am Main)
 Jürgen Gauß – theoretical chemistry (Johannes Gutenberg University of Mainz)
 Günther Hasinger – astrophysics (Max Planck Institute for Extraterrestrial Physics, Garching)
 Christian Jung – plant breeding (University of Kiel)
 Axel Ockenfels – experimental economics (University of Cologne)
 Wolfgang Peukert – mechanical process engineering (Friedrich-Alexander-University, Erlangen-Nuremberg)
 Barbara Stollberg-Rilinger – History of early modern Europe (University of Münster)
 Andreas Tünnermann – microsystems technology (Fraunhofer Institute for Applied Optics and Precision Engineering, Jena)

2004:
 Frank Allgöwer – control engineering (University of Stuttgart)
 Gabriele Brandstetter – theatre science (Free University of Berlin)
 Thomas Carell – organic chemistry (Ludwig Maximilian University of Munich)
 Karl Christoph Klauer – social and cognitive psychology (University of Bonn)
 Hannah Monyer – neurobiology (Ruprecht Karls University of Heidelberg)
 Nikolaus Pfanner and Jürgen Soll – biochemistry/molecular cell biology of plants (Albert Ludwigs University of Freiburg and Ludwig Maximilian University of Munich)
 Klaus Dieter Pfeffer – immunology (Heinrich Heine University)
 Dierk Raabe – material science (Max Planck Institute for Iron Research GmbH, Düsseldorf)
 Konrad Samwer – solid state physics (Georg August University of Göttingen)
 Manfred Strecker – structural geology (University of Potsdam)

2003:
 Winfried Denk – medical optics (Max Planck Institute for Medical Research, Heidelberg)
 Hélène Esnault and Eckart Viehweg – algebraic geometry (University of Duisburg and Essen)
 Gerhard Huisken – geometrical analysis (Max Planck Institute for Gravitational Physics (Albert Einstein Institute), Golm, Potsdam)
 Rupert Klein – computational fluid dynamics (Free University of Berlin and Potsdam Institute for Climate Impact Research)
 Albrecht Koschorke – Renaissance and modern German literature (University of Constance)
 Roland Lill – cell biology/biochemistry (Philipps University of Marburg)
 Christof Niehrs – molecular development biology (Deutsches Krebsforschungszentrum, Heidelberg)
 Ferdi Schüth – inorganic chemistry (Max Planck Institute für Kohlenforschung (Coal Research) (rechtsfähige Stiftung), Mülheim/Ruhr)
 Hans-Peter Seidel – graphics (Max Planck Institute for Informatics, Saarbrücken)
 Hubert Wolf – history of Christianity/Catholic theology (University of Münster)

2002:
 Carmen Birchmeier-Kohler – molecular biology (Max Delbrück Center for Molecular Medicine, Berlin-Buch)
 Wolfgang Dahmen – mathematics (RWTH Aachen)
 Wolf-Christian Dullo – paleontology (University of Kiel)
 Bruno Eckhardt – theoretical physics (Philipps University of Marburg)
 Michael Famulok – biochemistry (University of Bonn)
 Christian Haass – pathological biochemistry (Ludwig Maximilian University of Munich)
 Franz-Ulrich Hartl – cell biology (Max Planck Institute for Biochemistry, Martinsried)
 Thomas Hengartner – cultural anthropology (University of Hamburg)
 Reinhold Kliegl – general psychology (University of Potsdam)
 Wolfgang Kowalsky – optoelectronics (Technische Universität Braunschweig)
 Karl Leo – solid state physics (Technische Universität Dresden)
 Frank Vollertsen – forming and stretching manufacturing engineering (University of Paderborn)

2001:
 Jochen Feldmann – optoelectronical component (Ludwig Maximilian University of Munich)
 Eduard Christian Hurt – molecular biology (Ruprecht Karls University of Heidelberg)
 Hans Keppler – mineralogy (University of Tübingen)
 Arthur Konnerth – neurophysiology (Ludwig Maximilian University of Munich)
 Ulrich Konrad – musicology (University of Würzburg)
 Martin Krönke – immunology/cell biology (University of Cologne)
 Joachim Küpper – Romantic literary theory (Free University of Berlin)
 Christoph Markschies – history of Christianity (Ruprecht Karls University of Heidelberg)
 Wolfgang Marquardt – process systems engineering (RWTH Aachen)
 Helge Ritter – informatics (University of Bielefeld)
 Günter Ziegler – mathematics (Technische Universität Berlin)

2000:
 Klaus Fiedler – cognitive social psychology (Ruprecht Karls University of Heidelberg)
 Peter Greil – materials science (Friedrich-Alexander-University, Erlangen-Nuremberg)
 Matthias W. Hentze – molecular biology (European Molecular Biology Laboratory, Heidelberg)
 Peter M. Herzig – geochemistry and economic geology (Freiberg University of Mining and Technology)
 Reinhard Jahn – cellular biology (Max Planck Institute for Biophysical Chemistry (Karl Friedrich Bonhoeffer Institute), Göttingen)
 Aditi Lahiri – general linguistics (University of Constance)
 Gertrude Lübbe-Wolff – public law (University of Bielefeld)
 Dieter Lüst – theoretical physics (Humboldt University of Berlin)
 Stefan Müller – mathematics (Max Planck Institute for Mathematics in the Sciences, Leipzig)
 Manfred Pinkal – computational linguistics (Saarland University)
 Ilme Schlichting – biophysics (Max Planck Institute for Molecular Physiology, Dortmund)
 Friedrich Temps and Hans-Joachim Werner – physical chemistry (University of Kiel) and Theoretische Chemie (University of Stuttgart)
 Martin Wegener – solid state physics (University of Karlsruhe)

1999–1990 
1999 |
1998 |
1997 |
1996 |
1995 |
1994 |
1993 |
1992 |
1991 |
1990

1999:
 Ekkard Brinksmeier – manufacturing engineering (University of Bremen)
 Bernd Bukau – cellular biology (Albert Ludwigs University of Freiburg)
 Joachim Cuntz – mathematics (University of Münster)
 Alois Fürstner – organometalic chemistry (Max Planck Institute für Kohlenforschung (Coal Research) (rechtsfähige Stiftung), Mülheim/Ruhr)
 Friedrich Wilhelm Graf – Evangelical theology (University of Augsburg)
 Ulrich Herbert – modern and contemporary history (Albert Ludwigs University of Freiburg)
 Martin Johannes Lohse – pharmacology (University of Würzburg)
 Volker Mosbrugger – paleontology (University of Tübingen)
 Hans-Christian Pape – neurophysiology (Otto von Guericke University of Magdeburg)
 Joachim Ullrich – experimental physics (Albert Ludwigs University of Freiburg)

1998:
 Heinz Breer – zoology (University of Hohenheim)
 Nikolaus P. Ernsting and Klaus Rademann – physical chemistry (Humboldt University of Berlin)
 Hans-Jörg Fecht – metallic materials (University of Ulm)
 Ute Frevert – modern history (University of Bielefeld)
 Wolf-Bernd Frommer – molecular plant physiology (University of Tübingen)
 Christian Griesinger – organic chemistry (Johann Wolfgang Goethe University Frankfurt am Main)
 Regine Hengge-Aronis – microbiology (University of Constance)
 Onno Oncken – geology (GeoForschungsZentrum, Potsdam and Free University of Berlin)
 Hermann Parzinger – prehistoric and early historical Europe (German Archaeological Institute, Berlin)
 Ingo Rehberg – experimental physics (Otto von Guericke University of Magdeburg)
 Dietmar Vestweber – cellular biology/biochemistry (University of Münster)
 Annette Zippelius – solid state physics (Georg August University of Göttingen)

1997:
 Thomas Boehm – molecular development biology (Deutsches Krebsforschungszentrum, Heidelberg)
 Wolfgang Ertmer – experimental physics (University of Hannover)
 Angela D. Friederici – neuropsychology (Max Planck Institute for Neuropsychological Research, Leipzig)
  – microbiology (Albert Ludwigs University of Freiburg)
 Jean Karen Gregory – material science (Technical University of Munich)
 Andreas Kablitz – Romance philology/Italian studies (University of Cologne)
 Matthias Kleiner – sheet metal forming (Technical University of Cottbus)
 Paul Knochel – organometallic chemistry (Philipps University of Marburg)
 Elisabeth Knust – development genetics (Heinrich Heine University Düsseldorf)
 Stephan W. Koch – theoretical physics (Philipps University of Marburg)
 Christian F. Lehner – molecular genetics (University of Bayreuth)
 Stefan M. Maul – ancient orientalism (Ruprecht Karls University of Heidelberg)
 Ernst Mayr – information theory (Technical University of Munich)
 Gerhard Wörner – mineralogy/geochemistry (Georg August University of Göttingen)

1996:
 Eduard Arzt – materials science (University of Stuttgart and Max Planck Institute for Metals Research, Stuttgart)
 Hans Werner Diehl – theoretical physics (University of Duisburg and Essen)
 Gerd Faltings – mathematics (Max Planck Institute for Mathematics, Bonn)
 Ulf-Ingo Flügge – biochemistry of plants, (University of Cologne)
 Wolfgang Klein – linguistics (Max Planck Institute for Psycholinguistics, Nijmegen)
 Dieter Langewiesche – modern history (University of Tübingen)
  – molecular biology (Philipps University of Marburg)
 Joachim Reitner – paleontology (Georg August University of Göttingen)
 Michael Reth – immunology (Max Planck Institute for Immunobiology, Freiburg)
 Wolfgang Schnick – solid state chemistry (University of Bayreuth)
 Winfried Schulze – history of early modern Europe (Ludwig Maximilian University of Munich)
 Reinhard Zimmermann – history of law and civil law (University of Regensburg)

1995:
 Siegfried Bethke – elementary particle physics (RWTH Aachen)
 Niels Birbaumer – psychophysiology (University of Tübingen)
 Hans-Joachim Freund – physical chemistry (Ruhr University Bochum)
 Martin Grötschel – applied mathematics (Technische Universität Berlin)
 Axel Haverich – surgery (University of Kiel)
 Gerhard Hirzinger – robotics (German Aerospace Center, Oberpfaffenhofen)
  – biochemistry (University of Hamburg)
 Gerd Jürgens – molecular plant development (University of Tübingen)
 Wolfgang Schleich – quantum optics (University of Ulm)
 Manfred G. Schmidt – political science (Ruprecht Karls University of Heidelberg)
 Thomas Schweizer (†) – cultural anthropology (University of Cologne)
 Elmar Weiler – plant physiology (Ruhr University Bochum)
 Emo Welzl – informatics (Free University of Berlin)

1994:
 Gisela Anton – experimental physics (University of Bonn)
 Manfred Broy and Ernst-Rüdiger Olderog – computer science (Technical University of Munich and University of Oldenburg)
 Ulrich R. Christensen – geophysics (Georg August University of Göttingen)
 Ulf Eysel – neurophysiology (Ruhr University Bochum)
 Theodor Geisel – theoretical physics (Johann Wolfgang Goethe University Frankfurt am Main)
 Peter Gruss – cellular biology (MPI for biophysical chemistry, Göttingen)
 Wolfgang Hackbusch – numerical mathematics (University of Kiel)
 Adrienne Héritier and Helmut Willke – sociology/politology (University of Bielefeld)
 Stefan Jentsch – molecular biology (Ruprecht Karls University of Heidelberg)
 Glenn W. Most – classical philology (Ruprecht Karls University of Heidelberg)
 Johann Mulzer – organic chemistry (Free University of Berlin)
 Peter Schäfer – Jewish studies (Free University of Berlin)

1993:
 Christian von Bar – international privatright (Universität Osnabrück)
 Johannes Buchmann and Claus-Peter Schnorr – information theory (Universität Saarbrücken and Johann Wolfgang Goethe University Frankfurt am Main)
 Dieter Enders – organic chemistry (RWTH Aachen)
 Gunter Fischer – biochemistry (Martin Luther University of Halle-Wittenberg)
  – neuroanatomy (Albert Ludwigs University of Freiburg)
 Jürgen Jost – mathematics (Universität Bochum)
 Regine Kahmann – molecular genetics (Ludwig Maximilian University of Munich)
 Wolfgang Krätschmer – nuclear physics (MPI für Kernphysik, Heidelberg)
 Klaus Petermann – high frequency technics (Technische Universität Berlin)
 Wolfgang Prinz – psychology (MPI für für Psychologische Forschung, München)
 Rudolf G. Wagner – sinology (Ruprecht Karls University of Heidelberg)
 Jürgen Warnatz – technical combustion (University of Stuttgart)

1992:
 Georg W. Bornkamm – virology (GSF-Forschungszentrum für Umwelt und Gesundheit München)
 Christopher Deninger, Michael Rapoport, Peter Schneider and Thomas Zink – mathematics (University of Münster, Bergische University Wuppertal, University of Cologne and University of Bielefeld)
 Irmela Hijiya-Kirschnereit – japanology (Free University of Berlin)
 Jürgen Kocka – history of sociology (Free University of Berlin)
 Joachim Menz – mine surveying (Freiberg University of Mining and Technology)
 Friedhelm Meyer auf der Heide and Burkhard Monien – informatics (University of Paderborn)
 Jürgen Mlynek – experimental physics (University of Constance)
 Svante Pääbo – molecular biology (Ludwig Maximilian University of Munich)
 Wolfgang Raible – romanistics (Albert Ludwigs University of Freiburg)
 Hans-Georg Rammensee – immunology (Max Planck Institute for Developmental Biology, Tübingen)
 Jan Veizer – geochemistry of sediments (Ruhr University Bochum)

1991:
 Gerhard Ertl – physical chemistry (Fritz Haber Institute of the MPG, Berlin)
 Dieter Fenske and Michael Veith – inorganic chemistry (University of Karlsruhe and Saarland University)
 Ernst O. Göbel – solid state physics (University of Marburg)
 Dieter Häussinger – internal medicine (Albert Ludwigs University of Freiburg)
 Karl-Heinz Hoffmann – applied mathematics (University of Augsburg)
 Randolf Menzel – zoology/neurobiology (Free University of Berlin)
 Rolf Müller – biochemistry/molecular biology (University of Marburg)
 Hermann Riedel – material mechanics (Fraunhofer-Institut für Werkstoffmechanik Freiburg)
 Hans-Ulrich Schmincke – mineralogy/vulcanology (Forschungszentrum für Marine Geowissenschaften Kiel)
 Michael Stolleis – history of law (Johann Wolfgang Goethe University Frankfurt am Main)
 Martin Warnke – history of art (University of Hamburg)

1990:
 Reinhard Genzel – astrophysics (Max Planck Institute for Astrophysics, Garching)
 Rainer Greger – physiology (Albert Ludwigs University of Freiburg)
 Ingrid Grummt – microbiology (University of Würzburg)
 Martin Jansen and Arndt Simon – inorganic chemistry (University of Bonn and Max Planck Institute for Solid State Research, Stuttgart)
 Bert Hölldobler – zoology (University of Würzburg)
 Konrad Kleinknecht – experimental physics (Johannes Gutenberg University of Mainz)
 Norbert Peters – combustion engineering (RWTH Aachen)
 Helmut Schwarz – organic chemistry (Technische Universität Berlin)
 Dieter Stöffler – planetology (University of Münster)
 Richard Wagner – material science (GKSS-Forschungszentrum Geesthacht)

1989–1986 
1989 |
1988 |
1987 |
1986

1989:
 Heinrich Betz – neurobiology (Ruprecht Karls University of Heidelberg)
 Claus Wilhelm Canaris – civil law (Ludwig Maximilian University of Munich)
 Herbert Gleiter – material science (Saarland University)
 Theodor W. Hänsch – laser physics (Ludwig Maximilian University of Munich and Max Planck Institute for Quantum Optics, Garching)
 Joachim Milberg – production technics (Technical University of Munich)
 Jürgen Mittelstraß – philosophy (University of Constance)
 Sigrid D. Peyerimhoff – theoretical chemistry (University of Bonn)
 Manfred T. Reetz – organic chemistry (Philipps University of Marburg)
 Michael Sarnthein and Jörn Thiede – marine geology (University of Kiel and Leibniz-Institut für Meereswissenschaften Kiel)
 Reinhard Stock – experimental nuclear physics (Johann Wolfgang Goethe University Frankfurt am Main)
 Wolfgang Stremmel – internal medicine (Heinrich Heine University of Düsseldorf)

1988:
  – high frequency technics (Technische Universität Braunschweig)
 Lothar Gall – modern history (Johann Wolfgang Goethe University Frankfurt am Main)
 Günter Harder – mathematics (University of Bonn)
 Walter Haug and Burghart Wachinger – older German literature science (University of Tübingen)
 Werner Hildenbrand – social economics (University of Bonn)
 Ingo Müller – theoretical physics (Technische Universität Berlin)
 Herbert W. Roesky and George Michael Sheldrick – inorganic chemistry (Georg August University of Göttingen)
 Wolfram Saenger and Volker Erdmann – biochemistry (Free University of Berlin)
 Günther Schütz – molecular biology (German Cancer Research Center, Heidelberg)
 Hans Wolfgang Spiess – physical chemistry (Max Planck Institute for Polymer Research, Mainz)
 Karl Otto Stetter – microbiology (University of Regensburg)
 Thomas Weiland – high energy physics (DESY (German electron synchrotron), Hamburg)

1987:
 Gerhard Abstreiter – semiconductor physics (Technical University of Munich)
 Knut Borchardt – history of economics/social economics (Ludwig Maximilian University of Munich)
 Nils Claussen – ceramic materials (Technical University of Hamburg-Harburg)
 Bernd Giese – organic chemistry (Technische Universität Darmstadt)
 Wolfgang A. Herrmann and Hubert Schmidbaur – inorganic chemistry (Technical University of Munich)
 Günter Hotz, Kurt Mehlhorn and Wolfgang Paul – Computer Science (Saarland University)
 Erwin Neher and Bert Sakmann – biophysical chemistry (Max Planck Institute for Biophysical Chemistry / Karl Friedrich Bonhoeffer Institute), Göttingen
 Friedrich A. Seifert – mineralogy (University of Bayreuth)
 Rudolf K. Thauer – biochemical microbiology (Philipps University of Marburg)
 Hans-Peter Zenner – Otolaryngology/cell biology (University of Würzburg)

1986:
 Géza Alföldy – ancient history (Ruprecht Karls University of Heidelberg)
 Dietrich Dörner – psychology (Otto-Friedrich University)
 Jürgen Habermas – philosophy (Johann Wolfgang Goethe University Frankfurt am Main)
 Otto Ludwig Lange and Ulrich Heber – ecology and biochemistry (University of Würzburg)
 Hartmut Michel – biology (Max Planck Institute of Biochemistry, Martinsried)
 Christiane Nüsslein-Volhard and Herbert Jäckle – biology (Max Planck Institute for Developmental Biology, Tübingen)
 Peter R. Sahm – casting (RWTH Aachen)
 Fritz Peter Schäfer – laser physics (MPI für biophysikalische Chemie, Göttingen)
 Frank Steglich – solid state physics (Technische Universität Darmstadt)
 Albert H. Walenta – experimental physics (University of Siegen)
 Julius Wess – theoretical physics (University of Karlsruhe)

See also 

 List of general science and technology awards 
 List of physics awards

References

External links
Official description
Recipients (in German)

Science and technology awards
Gottfried Wilhelm Leibniz
Awards established in 1985
1985 establishments in West Germany
German science and technology awards